The Greek rock lizard (Hellenolacerta graeca) is a species of lizard in the family Lacertidae. Endemic to Greece, its natural habitats are temperate forests, Mediterranean-type shrubby vegetation, rocky areas, and pastureland. It is threatened by habitat loss.The International Union for Conservation of Nature has listed it as being "near threatened".

Description
The body is somewhat flattened and the legs are relatively long and slender. The colour is usually a glossy greyish-brown but may be more yellowish-brown, sometimes with a faint reddish tinge. Males have irregular dark spots on the back and dark flanks with many small pale spots. Females have smaller heads, fewer dark spots on the back and the pale spots on the flanks are more diffuse. Sometimes there are one or two blue spots above the shoulder; in males, these may extend a short way along the flanks. The underparts are yellow or orange and are usually speckled with fine dark markings, especially on the throat.

Distribution and habitat
It is typically found near streams and pools, in light woodland, at the edge of fields bordering woodland and in shady areas of rock or scree.(rocky habitats with sufficient humidity).

Behaviour
The Greek rock lizard is an agile species and climbs on rocks, walls, parapets and tree trunks but avoids prolonged periods in the full sun. Although it is mainly a climber, it does sometimes forage on the ground. The female lays a single clutch of up to six eggs, in a crevice or concealed place, and the eggs take about six weeks to hatch. When the lizard gets angry, it will in some cases spit acid at other animals that annoy it.

Status
The chief threats faced by the Greek rock lizard are fires and the planting of Eucalyptus trees in place of the natural vegetation of the region. The International Union for Conservation of Nature has listed it as being "near threatened" and bordering on "vulnerable.

References

Lacertidae
Endemic fauna of Greece
Lizards of Europe
Reptiles described in 1886
Taxa named by Jacques von Bedriaga
Taxonomy articles created by Polbot